Juliet Cowan (born 21 May 1974 in Belfast, Northern Ireland) is a British television, film and stage actress. Cowan has had various TV guest star roles in long-running shows such as EastEnders, Silent Witness and Casualty. Cowan has also had a recurring role in the CBBC show The Sarah Jane Adventures, This Life and BBC comedy Back to Life.

Career
Cowan's first aired acting role was in the 1993 live performance video Raising Hell, by Iron Maiden, which was broadcast live on pay-per-view television in the United Kingdom and on MTV in North America. She was not credited for this performance, however. Cowan guest-starred in over 20 episodes of The Bill as Julie Saunders, the mother of the boy who accused PC Tony Stamp of sexual assault. She also starred in "The Wench Is Dead", the penultimate episode of the Inspector Morse series, as Joanna Franks, a Victorian woman who is murdered on board a canal boat.

She played recurring characters Nicki in This Life (1997), Carla in Series 7 of The Queen's Nose, air stewardess Polly Arnold in the now defunct Channel 5 soap opera Family Affairs (2001), Tanya in Pulling (2003), and Chrissie Jackson in The Sarah Jane Adventures, making her first appearance in the first episode "Invasion of the Bane" (2007). She was social worker Josie in two episodes of the series Shameless in 2009. In 2006, Cowan appeared in a short film entitled Goodbye to the Normals. It was a promotional video for Robbie Williams, directed by Jim Field Smith and featuring the song "Burslem Normals".

Cowan has also appeared in television adverts for Danone Actimel (2003 to 2004), Nationwide Building Society (2006), Cadbury's (2007), and Cif cleaning products (2008) She was a finalist in the So You Think You're Funny competition at the 1999 Edinburgh Festival Fringe. On 5 March 2009, Cowan guest-starred in Episode 7, "JJ", of the third series of the teen drama Skins. She plays the mother of the character JJ and returned again in the sixth episode of the fourth series to reprise the role. In 2010 she appeared in two episodes of PhoneShop as Lance's wife Shelley, as well as in a Christmas advertisement for Boots; an appearance which has evolved into a more recurring role in subsequent commercials for Boots. Cowan played Sharon Watts's Bridesmaid Nina Hewland in EastEnders on 13–14 August 2012. From September 2012, she acted as Stanley Brown's mother in the CBBC programme The Revolting World of Stanley Brown. In late 2013 Cowan acted as Rosa Zipzer for the new CBBC programme 'Hank Zipzer' along with Henry Winkler. Cowan appeared in an episode of Utopia for Channel Four as Bridget in July 2014.

2018 saw her play real-life character Tracey Rogers in Killed by My Debt for the BBC. In 2022 she appeared in Dylan Moran sit-com Stuck.

In February 2023, it was announced that Cowan was added to the cast of the Amy Winehouse biopic Back to Black and would be playing Winehouse's mother Janis Winehouse-Collins.

Filmography

Television

References

External links
 

Living people
1974 births
English film actresses
English stage actresses
English television actresses
Actresses from London
21st-century English actresses
20th-century English actresses
Actresses from Belfast